Maybe Mars is an independent record label founded in 2007. Their current catalogue includes Carsick Cars, P.K.14, Joyside, Snapline, SMZB, Liu Kun, Dear Eloise, among others.

Current Artists

 Carsick Cars
 Snapline
 Demerit
 SMZB
 P.K.14
 WHITE
 Oh! Dirty Fingers
 Hiperson
 Dear Eloise
 Dream Can
 AV Okubo
 Birdstriking
 Chui Wan
 FAZI
 Lonely Leary
 Alpine Decline
 Hiperson
 The Bedstars
 Future Orients
 Backspace
 Deadly Cradle Death
 Run Run Run

Alumni Artists

 Joyside
 Low Wormwood
 Ourself Beside Me
 The Gar
 Xiao He
 (((10)))
 Hot & Cold
 Ex-Punishment
 Muscle Snog
 8 Eye Spy
 Liu Kun
Guai Li
 24 Hours
 Rustic
 Skip Skip Ben Ben
 Flyx
 Old Fashion
 Traveller
 Boyz&Girl
 Mr. Graceless
 Duck Fight Goose
 The Yours
 Proximity Butterfly

Discography

Notes

Chinese record labels